Ivan Nikolajevich Rimsky-Korsakov, né Korsav (29 June 1754 in Saint Petersburg, Russian Empire – 31 July 1831 in Saint Petersburg, Russian Empire) was a Russian courtier and lover of Catherine the Great from 1778 to 1779. He was a member of the same family which produced composer Nikolai Rimsky-Korsakov.

Biography
Ivan Rimsky-Korsakov was introduced to Catherine by Grigory Potemkin after he had been vetted by Praskovja Bruce. Rumours that Catherine had her ladies-in-waiting 'test' her potential favorites are unsubstantiated by the historical record. Furthermore, Potemkin played an important role in Catherine's life, but there is no evidence to suggest that he literally picked and presented his successors in the bedchamber to Catherine.

Catherine called Korsakov Pyrrhus because of his classic beauty, his singing and his violin playing. In 1779, Catherine caught him being unfaithful with Bruce. It is believed that she was directed to the right room by Aleksandra von Engelhardt on the order of Potemkin, who wished for the fall of both Rimsky-Korsakov and Bruce. In that case, he succeeded since Rimsky-Korsakov and Bruce lost their positions at court.

Rimsky-Korsakov lived the rest of his life in Brattsevo, near Moscow, in a relationship with the married Countess Stroganova, née Princess Ekaterina Petrovna Trubetskaya, with whom he had four children (Varvara, Vladimir, Vassily and Sophia). They were given the name Ladomirsky, the name of an extinct Polish noble family, and were ennobled by an imperial ukaze on 11 November 1798. Varvara Ivanovna Ladomirsky married Ivan Dimitrievich Narishkin and was the great-great-grandmother of Prince Felix Yussupov.

References 
 Marie Tetzlaff : Katarina den Stora (Catherine the Great) (1997) (In Swedish)
 Simon Sebac Montefiore : Potemkin och Katarina den stora – en kejserlig förbindelse (Potemkin and Catherine the Great – an imperial commitment) (2006) (In Swedish)

1754 births
1831 deaths
18th-century people from the Russian Empire
19th-century people from the Russian Empire
Lovers of Catherine the Great
Recipients of the Order of the White Eagle (Poland)